The Last House on the Beach (Italian: La settima donna, also known as Terror and The Seventh Woman) is a 1978 Italian rape and revenge-thriller film directed by Franco Prosperi.

The American title refers to Wes Craven's The Last House on the Left, and Alexandra Heller-Nicholas stated how "combining the nunsploitation subgenre with rape-revenge, the film deviates plot-wise from The Last House on the Left substantially, but arrives at a similar ethical conclusion".

It was argued that the final scene of the movie inspired the final scene in Quentin Tarantino's Death Proof.

Cast 
Florinda Bolkan: Sister Cristina
Ray Lovelock: Aldo
Flavio Andreini: Walter
Stefano Cedrati: Nino
Sherry Buchanan: Lisa

Production
The Last House on the Beach was Franco Prosperi's second film as a director he made for producer Pino Burichhi.

Release
The Last House on the Beach was distributed in Italy by Magirus and released on April 20, 1978. Roberto Curti, author of Italian Crime Filmography 1968-1980 described the film as "performing very poorly in the Italian box office". It grossed a total of 25.4 million Italian lira on its theatrical release.

Reception
Roberto Curti stated that the film was one of the sleaziest sexploitation films. Curti noted that the plot progression was minimal, and what was left was "a succession of grim, misogynist and exploitative scenes: adolescent nudes, slow motion sodomizations, vicious wounds, assorted killings."

Notes

Bibliography

External links

1978 films
1978 horror films
Rape and revenge films
1970s exploitation films
1970s crime thriller films
1970s slasher films
Italian slasher films
Giallo films
Nunsploitation films
Films scored by Roberto Pregadio
Films directed by Franco Prosperi
1970s Italian films